San Narith (born 7 November 1986) is a footballer from Cambodia. He made his first appearance for the Cambodia national football team in 2008.

Honours

Club
Phnom Penh Crown
Cambodian League: 2011
2011 AFC President's Cup: Runner up

Nagacorp FC
Hun Sen Cup: 2013

References 

1986 births
Living people
Cambodian footballers
Cambodia international footballers
Phnom Penh Crown FC players
Preah Khan Reach Svay Rieng FC players
Association football defenders
Nagaworld FC players